Skarinou is a village in the Larnaca District of Cyprus, located 4 km west of Kofinou.

The Skarinou Community Council Website includes a history of the village, and local community and business information.

References

Communities in Larnaca District